Art in America is an illustrated monthly, international magazine concentrating on the contemporary art world in the United States, including profiles of artists and genres, updates about art movements, show reviews and event schedules. It is designed for collectors, artists, art dealers, art professionals and other readers interested in the art world. It has an active website, ArtinAmericaMagazine.com.

Art in America is influential in the way it promotes exploration of important art movements. Over the years it has continued to reach a broad audience of individuals with interest pertaining to these cultural trends and movements.

History

Founded in 1913, Art in America covers the visual art world, both in the United States and abroad, with a concentration on New York City and contemporary art fairs.  Between 1921 and 1939 the magazine was published under the title Art in America and Elsewhere.

A number of well-known artists have been commissioned to design special covers for the magazine. Edward Steichen did one for its 50th birthday; Alexander Calder, Robert Rauschenberg, Roy Lichtenstein and Robert Indiana also created covers. For its 100th birthday the magazine planned special covers by Richard Prince, Cindy Sherman, and Urs Fischer.

Long-time editor Elizabeth C. Baker, who led the magazine for 34 years, resigned in June 2008 and was replaced by staff senior editor Marcia E. Vetrocq. She served as editor until January 2011. During her tenure, the magazine was re-designed, its international coverage expanded, and a website launched. Art market blogger and Bloomberg reporter Lindsay Pollock was named editor-in-chief in January 2011. Pollock announced that she was leaving in April 2017. Cynthia Zabel joined Art in America in 2005 as advertising director, and in 2008 was named publisher.

Art in America was sold to ARTnews SA, parent of ARTnews in 2015. In 2016, Brant Publications acquired both Art in America and ARTnews from ARTnews SA. In 2018, Penske Media Corporation, the parent company of Variety magazine, acquired ARTnews and Art in America from Brant.The print magazine used to be published 11 times a year, but as of 2021 it is published bi-monthly 6 times a year. The publication schedule was changed in 2020: Jan, Feb, Mar, Apr, May issues followed the old publication schedule, mid-year double-issues were adopted and 3 more 2020 issues were produced Sep/Oct, Nov/Dec and a double length Gallery Guide. Select reviews and features are uploaded to the website.

 Timeline 
Timeline: 100 Years of Art in AmericaEditors-in-chief
Wilhelm Valentiner (1913–1917)
Frederic Fairchild Sherman (1917–1940; founder)
Jean Lipman (first joined in 1934, editor-in-chief 1941–1970)
Brian O'Doherty (1971–1974)
Elizabeth C. Baker (1974–2008)
Marcia Vetrocq (2008–2011)
Lindsay Pollock (2011–2017)
William S. Smith (2017–)

Managing editors
Joan Simon (1974–1983)
Nancy Marmer (1983–1997)
Richard Vine (1998–2008, 2013–)
David Ebony (2008–2013)

ReadershipArt in America is widely read by art dealers, collectors, historians, art professionals, and others. It contains news and art criticism of painting, sculpture, photography, installation art, performance art, digital art, video and architecture in exhibition reviews, artist profiles, and feature articles.

Art in ActionChelsea Art Guide is a bi-monthly, free publication produced by Art in America. Chelsea Art is a current guide to New York's vast contemporary art district. With exhibition listings and an annotated map, Chelsea Art is a guide to the constantly changing geography of Chelsea.

ArtinAmericaMagazine.com
ArtinAmericaMagazine.com is Art in America''s website. Its offerings include a calendar of art world events, videos, live coverage of art fairs, and information on auctions.

Notable contributors

Robert Berlind
Maurice Berger
Mark Staff Brandl
Alfred Corn
G. Roger Denson
Carol Diehl
David Ebony
Franklin Einspruch
Hal Foster
Suzi Gablik
Jamey Gambrell
Eleanor Heartney
Dave Hickey
Henry T. Hopkins
Travis Jeppesen
Janet Koplos
Cathy Lebowitz
Joe Lewis
Nancy Marmer
Ted Mooney
Linda Nochlin
Craig Owens
Christopher Phillips
Peter Plagens
Nancy Princenthal
Carter Ratcliff
Walter Robinson
Lee Rosenbaum
Harold Rosenberg
Raphael Rubinstein
Peter Schjeldahl
Charles Stuckey
Richard Vine
Brian Wallis
Stephen Westfall

References

External links
Art in Americas official website
Early volumes of Art in America from 1913–1922, freely readable at HathiTrust.

Visual arts magazines published in the United States
Monthly magazines published in the United States
Magazines established in 1913
Contemporary art magazines
American contemporary art
1913 establishments in the United States
Magazines published in New York City
Penske Media Corporation